The 1994–95 Czech 2. Liga was the second season of the 2. česká fotbalová liga, the second tier of the Czech football league. The league was played with 18 teams, although the following season the number was reduced to 16 teams, so four relegation places were available.

League standings

Top goalscorers

See also 
 1994–95 Czech First League
 1994–95 Czech Cup

References

 Official website 

Czech 2. Liga seasons
Czech
2